The 2004 Dr Pepper Big 12 Football Championship Game was played on December 4, 2004 in Arrowhead Stadium in Kansas City, Missouri. The game determined the 2004 football champions of the Big 12 Conference. The #2 Oklahoma Sooners defeated the Colorado Buffaloes 42-3.

The teams
The Oklahoma Sooners came into the game with a perfect 11–0 record and #2 in the nation. They started the season with four home games, defeating Bowling Green, Houston, Oregon, and Texas Tech. The Sooners then traveled to Dallas for the Red River Shootout against #5 Texas, which they won 12-0. Oklahoma then beat Kansas State on the road; then returned home for their homecoming game against Kansas. Their next two games were both road games against ranked conference opponents; they beat #20 Oklahoma State and #22 Texas A&M. They finished the season with wins at home against Nebraska and at Baylor.

The Colorado Buffaloes came into the game with a 7–4 record; they were co-champions of the North Division (with Iowa State) and got into the championship game via head-to-head result. The Buffaloes started the season with three wins: Colorado State (in the Rocky Mountain Showdown), at Washington State and back home against North Texas. They lost the next two games against Missouri and #21 Oklahoma State. They beat Iowa State by 5, which would ultimately be their ticket into the Big 12 Championship Game. They dropped their next two matchups, losing to #17 Texas A&M and #8 Texas. They finished the regular season with three wins, however: at Kansas, at home against Kansas State, and at Nebraska.

Game summary
Oklahoma's success was fueled by quarterback Jason White, who exceeded 250 yards passing. The Sooners' offense ran over Colorado's defense, finishing the game with 498 total yards (to Colorado's 46) and 26 first downs (to Colorado's 3). They controlled the ball for just over 24 minutes, as opposed to the Buffaloes' 12 minutes of possession.

The Sooners' defense showed up as well; Colorado finished the game 0-12 on third down conversions and 0-1 on fourth down conversions.

Scoring summary

Statistics

References

Big 12 Championship Game
Big 12 Championship Game
Colorado Buffaloes football games
Oklahoma Sooners football games
2000s in Kansas City, Missouri
December 2004 sports events in the United States
2004 in sports in Missouri